"Until It's Time for You to Go" is a song from the 1965 album Many a Mile by Canadian singer-songwriter Buffy Sainte-Marie. Sainte-Marie included a French-language reworking of the song, "T'es pas un autre", on her 1967 album Fire & Fleet & Candlelight. French translation was made by Quebecer songwriter Claude Gauthier.

The song has been recorded by many other singers.

Background
The lyrics concern an ordinary man and woman who love each other, but cannot stay together because they come from different worlds.  The singer asks her (or, when sung by a man, his) lover: "Don't ask why / Don't ask how / Don't ask forever / Love me now."  According to Sainte-Marie, the song "popped into my head while I was falling in love with someone I knew couldn't stay with me."

"The Flower and the Apple Tree" 
Featured as a B-side to the Sainte-Marie's single release of "Until It's Time for You to Go" is the rarity "The Flower and the Apple Tree", an original song that was exclusive to the single.

Notable cover versions
It was a UK Top 20 hit for British group The Four Pennies in 1965. 
In 1970, Neil Diamond went to #11 on the US Easy Listening chart and #53 on the US Hot 100.
In 1972, Elvis Presley released the song, which peaked at #40 on the US Hot 100, and #9 on the US Easy Listening chart.
In 1973, New Birth featuring future Supremes member Susaye Greene recorded a version of the song, which peaked at #21 on the US Hot Soul Singles chart.

References

1965 songs
1965 singles
1970 singles
1972 singles
Buffy Sainte-Marie songs
New Birth (band) songs
Songs written by Buffy Sainte-Marie